Rob Kendrick (born 12 September 1985) is an English actor and musician. His father was the comedian Christopher Feltrup, and his mother the choreographer Elizabeth Kendrick. He is perhaps best known for his portrayal of Travis in Sugartown, Ollie in After Hours and Nick Harrison in The Syndicate.

Born in Rotherham, his family moved to Southport. He trained at the Royal Welsh College of Music & Drama in Cardiff where he received a university degree in acting. He is also a fully qualified dance teacher with the International Dance Teachers Association.

He lives with his wife Sydney Rae White.

Theatre 
Kendrick has performed with the NYMT, at the Globe, at West End theatres, with such ballet companies as the English National Ballet and the Birmingham Royal Ballet.

He has also performed in musicals, taking the role of Jimmy in the UK tour of Quadrophenia. He is part of the Squat Collective, a company set up to produce original work within site-specific spaces. Their last production was Helianthus.

Television 

 Caerdydd - Actor
 Sugartown (TV series) - Actor
 New Tricks (TV series) - Actor
 After Hours (TV series) - Actor
 Adie & Josh - Actor, Writer
 Funland - Actor, Writer
 The Syndicate (TV series) - Actor

External links 
 
Spotlight Profile

English male stage actors
Living people
1985 births
English male television actors
Actors from Rotherham
Male actors from Yorkshire